Donald Emerson Lewis (March 14, 1930 – January 12, 1991) was a Canadian politician. He served in the Legislative Assembly of British Columbia from 1972 to 1975, as a NDP member for the constituency of Shuswap.

References

British Columbia New Democratic Party MLAs
1930 births
1991 deaths